The Secretary of the Central Military Commission of the Communist Party of Vietnam is the highest party officials on military affairs in Vietnam.

Officeholders

Secretary of the Central Military Commission (1946–48)

Secretary of the General Military Commission (1952–61)

Secretary of the Central Military Commission (1961–84)

Central Military–Party Committee (1985–97)

Central Military Commission (1997–present)

Notes
1. These numbers are not official.
2. The Central Committee when it convenes for its first session after being elected by a National Party Congress elects the Politburo. According to David Koh, in interviews with several high-standing Vietnamese officials, the Politburo ranking is based upon the number of approval votes by the Central Committee. Lê Hồng Anh, the Minister of Public Security, was ranked 2nd in the 10th Politburo because he received the second-highest number of approval votes. Another example being Tô Huy Rứa of the 10th Politburo, he was ranked lowest because he received the lowest approval vote of the 10th Central Committee when he stood for election for a seat in the Politburo. This system was implemented at the 1st plenum of the 10th Central Committee. The Politburo ranking functioned as an official order of precedence before the 10th Party Congress, and some believe it still does.

References

Bibliography

  
 

Central Military Commission of the Communist Party of Vietnam
Lists of political office-holders in Vietnam